Jhansi is a major hub of education of Bundelkhand region of India; in the states of Uttar Pradesh and Madhya Pradesh. This article provides listing of educational institutions in Jhansi city. Bundelkhand University is a major university in central India and it offers a vast variety of courses.

Universities
Bundelkhand University, based in Jhansi, was formed on 26 August 1975 in Jhansi to cater for higher education in Bundelkhand. Since then the university has become a big campus with various other affiliated colleges, and a plethora of courses available.
Rani Laxmi Bai Central Agricultural University (founded 2013)

Bundelkhand College Jhansi (Estb: 1949)
 Bundelkhand Institute of Engineering & Technology
 Maharani Laxmi Bai Medical College
 Bipin Bihari Degree College(ESTB: 1959), Jhansi
 Chandra Shekhar Azad Institute Of Science And Technology
 College of Science & Engineering, Jhansi

Schools

 Army Public School, Jhansi
 Bhani Devi Goyal Saraswati Vidhya Mandir Inter College
 Christ the King College
 Allen House School
 Blue Bells Public School, Jhansi
 Cathedral College, Jhansi
 Don Bosco, Jhansi
 DPS Jhansi
 Government Inter College, Jhansi
 Gyan Sthali Public School
 Hansraj Modern Public School
 Jai Academy
 Kendriya Vidyalaya No.2, Jhansi (Rana Pratap Marg, Jhansi Cantt, Jhansi)
 Kendriya Vidyalaya No.3, Jhansi (Near St. Martin Church, Cariappa Marg, Jhansi Cantt, Jhansi)
 Kendriya Vidyalaya No.4, Jhansi (Gulam Gaus Marg, Railway Colony(W), Jhansi)
 Margaret Leask Memorial English School, Jhansi
 Modern Public School, Jhansi
 Mount Litera Zee School, Jhansi
 RNS World School, Jhansi
 Rani Laxmibai Group of Public Schools
 Sainik School, Jhansi
 St. Mark's College, Jhansi
 St. Francis College, Jhansi
 St. Umar Inter College, Jhansi
 Sun International School, Jhansi

See also
Jhansi#Education

References 

Education in Jhansi
Jhansi